Silvino Vidal (Albergaria-a-Velha, Portugal, March 21, 1850-Pelotas, Brazil, August 9, 1937) was a Portuguese-Brazilian writer.

After his mother's death, he moved to Porto Alegre with his sister and their father, there he published his first poem in a local newspaper "Álbum Semanal".

He wrote for several publications such as  "Álbum Semanal", "O Mosquito", "Diabrete", "Eco do Sul" and "Diário de Rio Grande", and he was a member of "Partenon Literário"

Books
Margaridas (1880)
Aquarelas (1885)

Sources
FERREIRA, Delfim Bismarck. Casa e Capela de Santo António (1999)
VAZ, Artur Emilio Alarcon. A lírica de imigrantes portugueses no Brasil meridional. v. 2
FERREIRA, Delfim Bismarck. artigo Jornal de Albergaria, 14/04/2009

External links
www.fontes.furg.br

1850 births
1937 deaths
Brazilian writers
Portuguese male writers
Portuguese emigrants to Brazil